Shay Hatten (born March 1993/1994) is an American screenwriter and producer. He is best known for his work on John Wick: Chapter 3 – Parabellum (2019), Army of the Dead, Army of Thieves (both 2021) and John Wick: Chapter 4 (2023).

Early life
Hatten was born in Oakland, California. He graduated from Moscow High School in 2012 and Loyola Marymount University's School of Film and Television in 2016.

Career
Hatten started his career by writing several films including John Wick: Chapter 3 – Parabellum (2019) and the 2021 Netflix films Army of the Dead and its prequel Army of Thieves. He is currently developing scripts for the upcoming action thriller Ballerina, John Wick: Chapter 4, and John Wick: Chapter 5, which are all part of the John Wick franchise. He will also write Maximum King!, which focuses on Stephen King during production on his only directorial feature film, Maximum Overdrive, (Future) Cult Classic, a satirical television series, and Rebel Moon, an epic space opera film for Netflix directed by Zack Snyder.

Filmography 
Film writer

Television

References

External links
 

1993 births
21st-century American comedians
21st-century American male writers
21st-century American screenwriters
American comedy writers
American male screenwriters
American male television writers
American television writers
Living people
Loyola Marymount University alumni
Screenwriters from California
Showrunners
Writers from Oakland, California